Greenville-Pickens Speedway is a race track located in Easley, South Carolina, just west of Greenville, South Carolina. The track hosted weekly NASCAR sanctioned races. Several NASCAR touring series have raced at the track in prior years, including the Whelen Southern Modified Tour and the NASCAR Grand National Division. NASCAR Cup Series and Xfinity Series teams frequently tested at the track until 2015, when all private testing was banned. The Upper South Carolina State Fair has been held at the fairgrounds adjacent to the race track since 1964. The capacity of the track was 35,000, including the Dale Earnhardt Backstretch, a three-tiered parking area where fans can take in races while tailgating or camping.

The track held 28 races on the NASCAR Grand National tour between 1955 until 1971. It also hosted two NASCAR Busch Grand National (now Xfinity Series) tour races in 1983. The April 10, 1971, race at Greenville-Pickens Speedway was the first NASCAR race nationally televised from start to finish, on ABC Wide World of Sports.

History
The track opened in 1940 as a half-mile dirt track. It was closed the following year for World War II like all race tracks in the United States. It reopened on July 4, 1946, in a race promoted by Bill France Sr. The race was the third of the day after 2 horse races. NASCAR began racing at the track in 1955. The track was paved as an asphalt track in April 1970. The last NASCAR Grand National race was held at the track in 1971, when NASCAR began cutting small tracks from its schedule.

The NASCAR Grand National Division's Busch North Series name was changed to Busch East Series in 2006 after the series' first Southern race, held at this track.

Rumors of track sale and closure
Beginning in February of 2023, after months of speculation and a lack of a race schedule posted, many unconfirmed and unsubstantiated rumors began to rapidly circulate about the track on social media. Most of these rumors began in the "Greenville-Pickens Speedway Fans" group on Facebook. Race fans flocked to social media to share their thoughts and opinions, with many sad to see a historic NASCAR track fade away. This media frenzy prompted many upset fans to point out that nearby Anderson Motor Speedway is still open, but could face a similar fate if attendance there drops.

Some passionate fans took it upon themselves to reach out via social media to tag famous names in racing, hoping they would be able to save the track from an uncertain fate. The speedway was a popular practice spot for many big names in the historic restrictor plate racing era such as Jeff Gordon and Tony Stewart among many other fan favorites over the years. With this small track having this level of notoriety, fans hoped big names in the racing community like Dale Earnhardt Jr., and Cleetus McFarland would come to the rescue. In recent years, both men have worked hard to resurrect dead or dying tracks, with Earnhardt Jr. financing a restoration of North Wilkesboro Speedway in North Carolina, and McFarland converting the defunct DeSoto Speedway in Bradenton, Florida, into the Freedom Factory, where he hosts car shows, exhibition races, and other events. As of March 2023, no official response has been posted by either Earnhardt Jr. or McFarland.

Another rumor circulating in early 2023 was that the track had been sold to former driver Benny Brezeale. Allegedly, Brezeale purchased the raceway, an included 100,000-square-foot building on the property and 305 acres of land surrounding the track for an unknown amount of money, but this has not been confirmed, and recent developments have contradicted this. 

Reported on March 9, 2023, local news outlet WYFF4 shared that the track was under contract.  The broker heralding the deal has stated that while offers have been made, including aggressive acquisition attempts from Realtylink,any deal was far from closing. Its current fate remains unknown.

NASCAR race winners

Grand National
 Note: The 1951 race at Air Base Speedway is sometimes erroneously credited as being held here.
1955 Tim Flock
1956 Buck Baker
1958 Jack Smith
1959 Junior Johnson
1959 Buck Baker
1960 Ned Jarrett (Greenville 200)
1961 Emanuel Zervakis (Greenville 200)
1961 Jack Smith (Pickens 200)
1961 Junior Johnson
1962 Ned Jarrett (Greenville 200)
1962 Richard Petty (Pickens 200)
1963 Buck Baker (Greenville 200)
1963 Richard Petty (Pickens 200)
1964 David Pearson (Greenville 200)
1964 LeeRoy Yarbrough (Pickens 200)
1965 Dick Hutcherson (Greenville 200)
1965 Dick Hutcherson (Pickens 200)
1966 David Pearson (Greenville 200)
1966 David Pearson (Pickens 200)
1967 David Pearson (Greenville 200)
1967 Richard Petty (Pickens 200)
1968 Richard Petty (Greenville 200)
1968 Richard Petty (Pickens 200)
1969 Bobby Isaac (Greenville 200)
1969 Bobby Isaac (Pickens 200)
1970 Bobby Isaac  (Greenville 200) – First NASCAR race after track was paved
1971 Bobby Isaac (Greenville 200) – 1st NASCAR race televised flag to flag. It was on ABC in prime-time by Jim McKay and Chris Economaki.
1971 Richard Petty (Pickens 200)

Busch Grand National
1983 Jack Ingram (Coca-Cola 200)
1983 Butch Lindley (DAPCO 200)

NASCAR Grand National Division, K&N East Series
2006 Sean Caisse
2007 Joey Logano
2008 Austin Dillon
2009 Brian Ickler
2010 Darrell Wallace Jr.
2011 Brett Moffitt^
2011 Sergio Peña
2012 Darrell Wallace Jr. (Spring)
2012 Corey LaJoie (Fall)
2013 Brandon Gdovic (Spring) 
2013 Dylan Kwasniewski (Summer)
2014 Ben Rhodes (Spring)
2014 Austin Hill (Summer)
2015 William Byron^
2016 Justin Haley (Spring)
2016 Kyle Benjamin^ (Summer)
2017 Kyle Benjamin
^ = Flag to flag

List of late model track champions
Track officials began writing its track champions on the wall in 1971, and they went back to 1957.
1957 Grady Hawkins (1)
1958 Elmo Henderson (1)
1959 David Pearson (1)
1960 Floyd Powell (1)
1961 Floyd Powell (2)
1962 Floyd Powell (3)
1963 Dub Nelson (1)
1964 Jeff Hawkins (1)
1965 Ralph Earnhardt (1)
1966 Ralph Earnhardt (2) 
1967 Jeff Hawkins (2)
1968 Jeff Hawkins (3)
1969 Jeff Hawkins (4)
1970 Jeff Hawkins (5) First track champion on pavement
1971 Johnny Allen (1) 
1972 Butch Lindley (1) 
1973 Don Miller (1) 
1974 Don Miller (2) 
1975 Bob Jarvis (1) 
1976 Don Sprouse (1) 
1977 Buddy Howard (1) 
1978 Buddy Howard (2) 
1979 Buddy Howard (3) 
1980 Buddy Howard (4) 
1981 Donnie Bishop (1) 
1982 Gene Morgan (1) 
1983 Donnie Bishop (2) 
1984 Donnie Bishop (3) 
1985 Roy Chatham (1) 
1986 Donnie Bishop (4) 
1987 Larry Hines (1) 
1988 Robert Pressley (1) 
1989 Larry Ogle (1) 
1990 Marty Ward (1) 
1991 Marty Ward (2) 
1992 Donnie Bishop (5) 
1993 Randy Porter (1) 
1994 Donnie Bishop (6) 
1995 Mardy Lindley (1) 
1996 Steve Howard (1) 
1997 Dexter Canipe (1) (NASCAR Weekly Series National Champion)
1998 Pete Silva (1) 
1999 Dennis Southerlin (1) 
2000 Gene Morgan (2) 
2001 Pete Silva (2) 
2002 Marty Ward (3) 
2003 Marty Ward (4) 
2004 Kenneth Headen (1)
2005 Blair Addis (1) 
2006 Randy Porter (2)
2007 David Roberts (1) 
2008 Marty Ward (5)
2009 Roger Powell (1) 
2010 Marty Ward (6) 
2011 Randy Porter (3)
2012 Toby Porter (1) 
2013 Anthony Anders (1)
2014 Anthony Anders (2) (NASCAR Weekly Series National Champion)
2015 David Roberts (2)
2016 Dylan Hall (1)
2017 Will Burns (1)
2018 Trey Gibson (1)
2019 Taylor Satterfield (1)
2020 Cameron Bolin (1)
2021 Ryan Walker (1)
2022 Mag Tate (1)

Race broadcasting

References

External links
Official website
Greenville-Pickens Speedway at nascar.com
NASCAR Commentators Crews and Networks
1971 Greenville 200

NASCAR tracks
Motorsport venues in South Carolina
NASCAR races at Greenville-Pickens Speedway
Sports venues in Pickens County, South Carolina
Sports venues completed in 1940
1940 establishments in South Carolina